Iury Lírio Freitas de Castilho (born 6 September 1995) is a Brazilian professional footballer who plays as a striker for Cuiabá.

Career
Iury Castilho is a product of Madureira, Tigres do Brasil and Avaí FC youth academies. He was brought up to Avai's first team in 2014 and made his professional debut with the club in February 2015 in the Campeonato Brasileiro Série A. He scored his first goal for the club in the Campeonato Catarinense against Clube Atlético Metropolitano on 19 February 2015. He stayed with the club for three years, leaving in 2017.

In July 2017 he signed a contract with the Ukrainian Premier League's FC Zorya Luhansk. In February 2018, Iury Castilho scored a spectacular bicycle kick in his team's 3–0 win over FC Vorskla Poltava, and celebrated by mimicking a monkey in response to having received "monkey chants".

On 7 June 2018, he moved to UAE Pro-League club Al-Nasr Dubai SC. He was loaned out to Al-Fayha six months later on 18 January 2019. At the end of the loan, he signed for Portimonense of the Portuguese Primeira Liga on a three-year contract in June 2019.

Honors 
CSA
Campeonato Alagoano: 2021

References

External links

Iury Castilho at playmakerstats.com (English version of ogol.com.br)

1995 births
Living people
Footballers from Rio de Janeiro (city)
Brazilian footballers
Association football forwards
Avaí FC players
FC Zorya Luhansk players
Al-Nasr SC (Dubai) players
Al-Fayha FC players
Portimonense S.C. players
Renofa Yamaguchi FC players
Centro Sportivo Alagoano players
Ceará Sporting Club players
Cuiabá Esporte Clube players
Ukrainian Premier League players
UAE Pro League players
Saudi Professional League players
Primeira Liga players
J2 League players
Campeonato Brasileiro Série A players
Campeonato Brasileiro Série B players
Brazilian expatriate footballers
Expatriate footballers in Ukraine
Brazilian expatriate sportspeople in Ukraine
Expatriate footballers in the United Arab Emirates
Brazilian expatriate sportspeople in the United Arab Emirates
Expatriate footballers in Saudi Arabia
Brazilian expatriate sportspeople in Saudi Arabia
Expatriate footballers in Portugal
Brazilian expatriate sportspeople in Portugal
Expatriate footballers in Japan
Brazilian expatriate sportspeople in Japan